Parkash Gian (born 19 June 1937) is an Indian wrestler. He competed in the men's freestyle lightweight at the 1960 Summer Olympics.

References

External links
 

1937 births
Living people
Indian male sport wrestlers
Olympic wrestlers of India
Wrestlers at the 1960 Summer Olympics
Sport wrestlers from Delhi